Nicholas Lee Ingram (20 November 1963 – 7 April 1995) was a British and American national, executed for murder in 1995 at the age of 31 by the US state of Georgia, using the electric chair. He was born in Britain, but had an American father. The British Prime Minister, John Major, declined to intervene and attempt to get him reprieved. He had been imprisoned since 1983 for the murder of J.C. Sawyer, and injuring his wife Mary Eunice Sawyer, during a robbery. The Archbishop of Canterbury, George Carey, was one of many who campaigned unsuccessfully for clemency. The case received widespread media coverage in the UK.

Early life
Ingram was born in England to a British mother, Ann, and an American father, Johnny Ingram.

Murder of Sawyer
At approximately 6:30 p.m. on 3 June 1983, Ingram, armed with a pearl-handled pistol, entered the home of J.C. and Mary Sawyer and demanded the use of their phone. Ingram stated that he wanted money and the keys to their car. He fired a shot through the floor of the living room to prove that the gun was not a toy and threatened to blow their heads off if they did not comply with his demands. In response, Mrs. Sawyer gave Ingram $60 and J.C. gave him the keys to his blue-and-white Chevrolet pickup truck.

Ingram then marched them outside and into the woods which surrounded their home. Using rope and some wire, Ingram tied his victims' hands behind them and then tied them to a tree. He told Mrs. Sawyer to remember a tattoo that she had noticed on his arm because it was going to get her killed. As the Sawyers begged for their lives, the defendant continued his threats, saying that he liked to torture people as he took off his shirt, tore it in two, and stuffed the two halves into their mouths. Then he shot them both in the head. J.C. Sawyer was killed; however, Mrs. Sawyer was only wounded.

She fell to the ground and pretended she was dead until she heard the truck drive off. Realizing that her husband was dead, Mrs. Sawyer managed to untie herself and went to a neighbor's house to call the police. Earlier that day, Ingram had gone to a pawn shop with his friend Kevin Plummer, in the latter's car, to sell some automobile wheels and a ring. Then they went to see a friend of Ingram's who worked at a convenience store. Afterwards, Ingram and Plummer drove to Ingram's father's house, where Ingram retrieved a pearl-handled .38 revolver. He told Plummer that he knew where he could get a vehicle that he was going to use to go to California. He directed Plummer to a driveway that led through the woods and up Blackjack Mountain in Cobb County. They drove a short distance up the driveway and stopped. Ingram got out and told Plummer to wait for him. He told Plummer that he might have to pistol-whip them but he was not sure he could shoot them. He walked up the driveway and out of sight. Plummer decided not to wait and drove home. At around 8 p.m., Ingram showed up at the convenience store he had visited earlier that day. He remained only a few moments, then left, driving a blue-and-white pickup truck. The pickup truck was recovered on Interstate 20 in Mississippi three days later. Inside was a motel receipt from Lincoln, Alabama, dated 3 June 1983. The motel's portion of the receipt was later obtained and the handwriting on it was identified as Ingram's. Ingram stole another car in California and was eventually arrested in Nebraska for DUI. While being questioned about the stolen automobile, Ingram told the police that he could save them some time; that if they would check with Cobb County, Georgia, they would find that he was wanted for two murders. Questioning stopped then, and was resumed by Georgia authorities after they had been contacted and had returned Ingram to Georgia. Ingram gave them a long statement in which he admitted remembering some of the events of the afternoon of 3 June, including being dropped off at the Sawyer driveway, returning to find Plummer gone, getting into a truck and backing out of the driveway. He stated that he woke up the next morning in a shopping centre parking lot in Alabama in the truck. He contended that he had blacked out from drinking and could not remember shooting or robbing anyone.

Murder conviction
Ingram was convicted of killing J. C. Sawyer, 55, a retired military veteran.

Controversy
In seeking to halt the execution, Ingram's lawyers argued that they had only recently learned that their client had been heavily drugged and medicated by prison officials before his 1983 trial and therefore was not aware enough of the proceedings to show a contrition that might have influenced jurors not to recommend the death penalty. Ingram's appeal lawyers argued that he was given an anti-psychotic drug during his trial that made him appear to be unemotional and remorseless. They also argued that his lawyer in that trial was not told of a diagnosis that Ingram had psychiatric problems, a diagnosis that might have altered the trying of the case. The Georgia Attorney General, Mike Bowers, countered that those issues had been addressed in previous appeals. The courts agreed. District Judge Horace Ward dismissed pleas by Ingram's lawyers for a new hearing to examine alleged new evidence that he was drugged at his trial in 1983 and unable to brief his defence lawyers.

Attempt on seeking clemency
Ingram's case had been taken up by the British media, prompting a flood of pleas for clemency – including one from the Archbishop of Canterbury – to Georgia's governor at the time, Zell Miller. Ingram's mother, Ann, and other relatives solicited and received statements appealing for clemency from 53 members of Parliament, the Archbishop of Canterbury, the president of the European Parliament and a number of human-rights groups. Mrs Ingram appealed for the intervention of Prime Minister John Major in a letter she delivered to him while he was visiting Washington. In a handwritten response, the Prime Minister replied: "I found your letter very moving and I can imagine the profound distress you must be feeling. But I have concluded, with deepest regret, that there are no proper grounds for the British Government to intervene with the State of Georgia."

Execution
In an "open letter to the British people" published in London newspapers, Ingram thanked those who had appealed on his behalf, adding: "If I die, I hope it is not for nothing. I hope people will see that a ritualistic killing in the electric chair solves nothing." Ingram declined a final meal, but later ate some crackers and chips bought by relatives from a prison vending machine. When the warden, Albert "Gerry" Thomas asked him if he had any last words, Ingram spat at him. When he was asked whether he wished to make a final statement, Ingram was said to have replied simply: "Let's get on with it".

According to Steve Boggan, Ann and Johnny Ingram last saw their son eight hours before his execution. Ingram's head was already shaved and he had worn a baseball cap to spare his parents the traumatic sight of his shaved head. There were two chaplains and officials from Georgia's prison service that were with him in the execution chamber when he died as well as six media representatives who went into the prison to view the execution. Ingram's lawyer, Clive Stafford Smith, also witnessed his execution. Ingram was pronounced dead at 9:15 p.m. according to Vicki Gavalas, the prison department spokeswoman for the Georgia Diagnostic and Classification Center/ Jackson State Prison. He died in Georgia's electric chair, Old Sparky.

See also
 Capital punishment in Georgia (U.S. state)
 Capital punishment in the United States
 List of people executed in Georgia (U.S. state)

References

1963 births
1995 deaths
20th-century executions of British people
20th-century executions by Georgia (U.S. state)
People executed by Georgia (U.S. state) by electric chair
British people executed abroad
People convicted of murder by Georgia (U.S. state)
People executed for murder